Craig Wilde (born 4 March 1976) is an English actor, voice actor, voice-over artist, television presenter, creative director and television producer.

He was born in Hatfield, Doncaster. He trained as an actor at the Royal Scottish Academy of Music and Drama (RSAMD), now the Royal Conservatoire of Scotland.

He promoted and produced House Music clubs from the mid-1990s until the early 2000s. He became widely known for his work with Fruitfly, a club that he promoted at the Arches nightclub in Glasgow from 1999 to 2002. He became the focus of several TV documentaries, one of which was STV and Grampian's 2001 documentary This Scotland. Also Lanarkshire TV's 'Nightclubing' programme, which explored Craig's world as a Club Promoter. At this time he also contributed to print media such as the Glasgow culture magazine Yum Yum and The Herald (Glasgow) newspaper, as well as a semi regular guest on some of BBC Radio Scotland's shows, notably 'The Brian Morton show'. In 2017 Craig continued to write for various newspapers and magazines, notably as food, travel and lifestyle contributor to North of England-based.

As Creative Director he ran several small marketing agencies based in Glasgow, Scotland in the early 2000s, principally serving the Drinks Industry and Licensed Leisure operators, before opening Bar Warhol in 2006, on Glasgow's Bath Street. Relocating to Newcastle to work with the city's leisure operators in 2006. Most notable was the reinvention of the Powerhouse club venue.

From 2010 onwards Craig has Presented live Streaming Bingo Web TV Channel Bingo Studio Live. As Creative Director Craig has worked with a number of Television personalities, notably Channel 4 show 'Britain's Benefit Tenants' stars, and Millionaire Property personalities –  Andrew Dyke and Alan Lee Ogden, developing vehicles for their careers, as Writer and Producer, principally of their Web Tv show Between the Bricks.

Wilde is a highly successful voice actor for Radio, Television and Corporate clients around the world, with notable projects for The Bank of China, Coca-Cola, Madbid, Fanta, as well as Narrating Documentaries for Reality Entertainment with their Conspiracy theory / Mystery series of films for Amazon Prime Video and Netflix distribution, also British Muslim TV series 'Half my Faith, all my struggle –  All the Extras, and more recently Devolver Digital Films & Fizz Pictures release the Call of Duty documentary titled 'CODumentary' released in September 2017.

In 2013 Wilde established a global Voice Actor Agency now branded Niltoni:Voice  and is a division of his Niltoni Group of Agencies. 

In 2019 he returned to TV screens playing the part of 'Marvin' in the Showtime (TV network) Christmas and holiday season Movie 'A Very British Christmas' which starred Rachel Shenton known for Channel 4 daytime Soap Opera Hollyoaks, Mark Killeen known for Game of Thrones and Michele Dotrice known for classic TV comedy Some Mothers Do 'Ave 'Em. Christmas 2020 'A Very British Christmas premiered on Channel 5 as part of their Christmas scheduling under the localised title A Very Yorkshire Christmas.

As a result of the COVID-19 pandemic, Craig led as part of his work with his agency Niltoni 360º, the development of an online shopping solution for Newcastle's 185 year old Grainger Market, creating what has been described as a 'Mini Amazon' store - with multiple traders taking part with one next day delivery. The project has continued to garner considerable local and national media interest;  the project has been heralded as a significant factor in keeping the world famous market and its many market traders 'Alive", A noted Food Blogger Craig has continued to be a huge supporter of the UK's Hospitality and food industry.

In 2021, Craig published his first book, a children's title The Elf Who Saved Christmas, the book was animated for the 2021 Christmas commercial for Grainger Market Delivery, with live action elements of the commercial starring Big Brother and How Clean Is Your House'' TV Star Kim Woodburn.

References

External links 
Official website

Living people
Actors from Doncaster
English television presenters
Male actors from Yorkshire
British marketing people
1976 births